Qazwini , the name is possibly derived either from both sources:

- Qazwini (Persian: قزويني qazwīni), the name derived from "Qazvin" (versions of the topographical surname: Qazvini, Qazwini, Qazvini, al-Quazvini), formerly the Safavid dynastic capital (1555-1598), which is Iran's calligraphy capital today. Also, the name refers to a dialect of Persian language, Qazvini.

- Qazwini (ِArabic: قزويني qazwīni), the old Arabicized name of the Caspian Sea, also called "Bahr Qazwin (بحر قزوين baḥr qazwīn)".

May refer to the following persons 
 Abu Abdallah Muh. b. Yazid b. Maja al-Rab`i al-Qazwini (fl. C9th) hadith scholar
 Abu Yahya Zakariya' ibn Muhammad al-Qazwini  (1203–1283), Persian physician geographer
 Najm al-Dīn al-Qazwīnī al-Kātibī (d. 1277 CE), Persian philosopher astronomer
 Ḥamdallāh Mustawfī Qazvīnī (1281–1349), Persian historian geographer
 Shah-Mohammad Qazvini (died 1557), palace physician and belle-lettrist
 Aref Qazvini (1882), Iranian poet  
 Mullá Hádí-i-Qazvini of the Bábís
 Mir Emad Hassani Qazvini, (1554-1615), master of calligraphy
 Hassan Al-Qazwini, (1964- ) Islamic Center Imam
 Budaq Monshi Qazvini (1510-1577), Persian composer
 Mohammad Taher Vahid Qazvini (d. 1699 CE), Iranian nobleman
 Goharshad Ghazvini (d. 1628 CE), Persian calligrapher
 Mohammad Qazvini (1876-1949), Iranian literary critic
 Murtadha al-Qazwini Twelver Shia Marja' 

Iranian-language surnames